It's a Mystery, Charlie Brown is the 11th prime-time animated television special based upon the popular comic strip Peanuts, by Charles M. Schulz. It was originally aired on the CBS network on February 1, 1974. This was the first Charlie Brown television special that Bill Melendez did not direct, but he still served as producer and provided the voices of Snoopy and Woodstock.

Summary
While building a nest on his tree, Woodstock has trouble keeping the straw for it together; and it falls apart and causes Woodstock and all the straw to fall to the ground. After a few unsuccessful attempts, Woodstock finally ties the straw together in a unique manner which makes it safe and secure.

Meanwhile, Sally vents her frustration to Charlie Brown over being assigned another science project.

Woodstock's nest disappears the next afternoon, so he turns to Snoopy for help.  Adopting the guise of Sherlock Holmes, Snoopy and Woodstock go on the hunt for the missing nest.

Most of the places they check include:
 Charlie Brown's house, where they wake him up and give him the third degree. He naturally denies anything about taking the nest.
 Lucy and Linus' house, using an excessive amount of dust to check for fingerprints. Snoopy eventually finds a broom straw and believes this is enough evidence to make Lucy a suspect. He tries to handcuff her, but she throws him out of the house.
 Marcie's house, where Snoopy pulls out his notepad and questions her on the whereabouts of the nest. She is unable to understand Snoopy in his dog language and slams the door in his face.
 Pig-Pen's house, where Snoopy immediately dismisses him as a suspect once he answers the door in his usual dusty trademark fashion entrance. As Snoopy takes off, Pig-Pen tells him to come back anytime because he does not get many visitors.
 Finally, the home of Peppermint Patty, who thinks Snoopy is playing Cops and Robbers, so she dons a burglar mask and chases him through her house. Frightened, Snoopy and Woodstock escape.

Upon stopping back at Woodstock's tree, Snoopy takes more notice of a set of footprints he had seen before; they lead away from Woodstock's tree, so the two follow them straight to the elementary school. After making their way inside through an open window, they ultimately find Woodstock's nest under glass in a display case. The two grab the nest and run back to Woodstock's tree where Snoopy sets it back in its proper place.

The next day, Sally complains to Charlie Brown that her science exhibit has been stolen. When she reveals that her exhibit was a so-called "prehistoric bird's nest", Charlie Brown puts two and two together and realizes it was she who took Woodstock's nest. Sally claims that the nest had to have been "prehistoric" since the straw was tied together unusually.

Even with Charlie Brown's explanation that the nest was made by Woodstock, Sally is convinced that since she found the nest, it belongs to her.  When she encounters Snoopy and Woodstock, she demands that they return her nest. The three are about to come to blows when Charlie Brown suggests that they handle the problem in a different way, so they all go to see Lucy in her psychiatric booth, which she temporarily converts to a courtroom enlisting Linus as stenographer, and she tacks two cents on to her normal five-cent fee to cover court costs and asks they pay in advance rather than after.  The two sides present their case to Judge Lucy: Snoopy, as Woodstock's attorney, with a document containing excessive legal jargon, and Sally with "Finders keepers, losers weepers". Stenographer Linus is not much help as he can only remember a few words said before the case was fully announced, but Lucy rules in favor of Woodstock, saying that since he built the nest, he should keep it.

Lucy's ruling leaves Sally without a science class exhibit, but Charlie Brown and Snoopy come up with an idea. Snoopy is willing to volunteer to be her exhibit in a re-creation of Pavlov's salivating dog experiment. Although Sally disagrees at first, she decides to go along with it and ultimately gets an "A" on her science project. In the end credits, as Woodstock lies on his nest, the bottom falls out, sending Woodstock falling out of his tree.

Voice cast
Todd Barbee as Charlie Brown
Melanie Kohn as Lucy van Pelt
Stephen Shea as Linus van Pelt
Donna Forman as Peppermint Patty
Jimmy Ahrens as Marcie
Lynn Mortensen as Sally Brown
Tom Muller as Pig-Pen
Bill Melendez as Snoopy/Woodstock
Peter Robbins (archived) – Lucy van Pelt, Peppermint Patty (screaming only)

Music score
The music score for It's a Mystery, Charlie Brown was composed by Vince Guaraldi and conducted and arranged by John Scott Trotter. The score was performed by the Vince Guaraldi Quartet on January 5, 11, 23 and 30, 1974, at Wally Heider Studios, featuring Guaraldi (piano, electric piano, electric harpsichord, electric guitar and whistling), Tom Harrell (trumpet), Seward McCain (electric bass), Eliot Zigmund (drums, January 11) and Mike Clark (drums, all other dates).

The song "Mystery Theme" was reworked in an uptempo version for It's the Easter Beagle, Charlie Brown, which was broadcast two months later.

"Little Birdie" (instrumental version)
"Mystery Theme"
"It's a Mystery, Charlie Brown" (version 1)
"Mystery Theme" (reprise)
"Sassy Sally" (slow variation of "It's a Mystery, Charlie Brown")
"Little Birdie" (instrumental version, reprise)
"It's a Mystery, Charlie Brown" (version 1 reprise)
"Mystery Theme" (second reprise)
"Cops and Robbers"
"It's a Mystery, Charlie Brown" (version 1 reprise)
"Mystery Theme" (third reprise)
"Cops and Robbers" (reprise)
"It's a Mystery, Charlie Brown" (version 2; school version)
"Sally's Blues"
"Mystery Interlude" (variation of "It's a Mystery, Charlie Brown")
"Joe Cool" (instrumental "whistling" version with brass)
"It's a Mystery, Charlie Brown" (version 1 reprise)
"Sassy Sally" (slow variation of "It's a Mystery, Charlie Brown")
"Mystery Theme" (fourth reprise, end credits)

No official soundtrack for It's a Mystery, Charlie Brown was released. However, recording session master tapes for seven 1970s-era Peanuts television specials scored by Guaraldi were discovered by his son, David, in the mid-2000s. The songs "Little Birdie" (instrumental version), "It's a Mystery, Charlie Brown" (third reprise, school version), "Cops and Robbers," "Sally's Blues" and "Joe Cool" (instrumental "whistling" version with brass) were released in 2008 on the compilation album, Vince Guaraldi and the Lost Cues from the Charlie Brown Television Specials, Volume 2. A live version of "Cops and Robbers" was also recorded by Guaraldi on February 6, 1974, for a radio performance released on Live on the Air.

Credits
 Created and Written by: Charles M. Schulz
 Story by: Jeffrey Moss, Jon Stone, Ray Sipherd, Norman Stiles, Joseph A. Bailey, Jerry Juhl
 Directed by: Phil Roman
 Produced by: Bill Melendez
 Executive Producer: Lee Mendelson
 A Lee Mendelson-Bill Melendez Production
 Music Composed and Performed by: Vince Guaraldi
 Music Supervision: John Scott Trotter

Home media
This special was released on DVD for the first time, in remastered form as part of the DVD box set, Peanuts 1970's Collection, Volume One. Before that, it was released on RCA's SelectaVision CED format in 1983, and on VHS by Kartes Video Communications in 1987, and by Paramount on August 17, 1994 (as part of a sweepstakes contest with Travelodge), and a mass market release on October 1, 1996. The Paramount release is notable for fixing an animation error where Charlie Brown, Sally, and Snoopy are shown in mid-air by zooming in the footage

References

External links
 

1970s animated television specials
CBS television specials
Peanuts television specials
Television shows directed by Phil Roman
1970s American television specials
1974 television specials
1974 in American television
Television shows written by Charles M. Schulz